The professional American football team now known as the Detroit Lions previously played in Portsmouth, Ohio, as the Portsmouth Spartans, from its founding in 1928 to its relocation to Detroit in 1934. Originally drawing players from defunct independent professional and semi-professional teams, they joined the fledgling National Football League in 1930. Their home stadium was Universal Stadium (known today as Spartan Municipal Stadium).

History

The Spartans formed in 1928 when the team began importing players from defunct independent professional and semi-professional teams. The following year, Portsmouth residents agreed to fund the construction of a football stadium that was comparable to those in neighboring communities along the Ohio River. That approval prompted the National Football League to grant the city a franchise on July 12, 1930. The Spartans played their first NFL game at Universal Stadium on September 14. With fewer than 43,000 residents in 1930, Portsmouth became the NFL's second smallest city, ahead of only Green Bay, which had a population of  under 38,000. During the team's first year in the league, the Spartans compiled a record of 5–6–3, tying for seventh place in the eleven-team league in 1930.

Early highlights as the Portsmouth Spartans include the "iron man" game against Green Bay in 1932. In that game, Spartans coach Potsy Clark refused to make even a single substitution against the defending NFL champion Packers. Portsmouth won 19–0 and used only 11 players all game. At the end of the 1932 season, the Spartans were tied for first place in the league with the Chicago Bears. That prompted what in retrospect became known as the first NFL playoff game. Blizzard conditions in Chicago meant the game was moved from Wrigley Field's outdoor field to the indoor field at Chicago Stadium, which allowed for only an 80-yard field. The game was won 9–0 by the Bears, on a touchdown pass from Bronko Nagurski to Red Grange. The resulting interest led to the establishment of Eastern and Western conferences and a regular championship game beginning in 1933.

Despite success on the field, the Spartans were fighting to survive off of it. The team was in so much debt that the players received shares in the team in lieu of their salaries. In 1934, a group led by George A. Richards, the owner of Detroit radio station WJR, was announced as having bought the Spartans and moved them to Detroit for the 1934 season. Richards renamed the team the Detroit Lions. He not only wanted to offer a nod to the Detroit Tigers, but also wanted to signal his goal of building a team that would be the "king of the NFL."

List of seasons

1 The result of the 1932 NFL Playoff Game to determine the NFL champion between the Chicago Bears and the Portsmouth Spartans counted in the standings.
2 Prior to the 1972 season, ties did not count in the NFL standings. Therefore, the Bears (6–1–6) and the Spartans (6–1–4) were considered to be tied atop the standings ahead of the Packers (10–3–1).

References

Detroit Lions
Portsmouth, Ohio
Portsmouth